Aplocheilichthys sp. nov. 'Baringo' is a formally undescribed species of fish in the family Poeciliidae, endemic to Kenya. Its natural habitat is freshwater lakes.

Sources 

 

Aplocheilichthys
Endemic freshwater fish of Kenya
Undescribed vertebrate species
Taxonomy articles created by Polbot